Nick Licata (born 1947) is a retired member of the Seattle City Council, having left office at the end of 2015 after being elected to five terms and serving 18 years. During his time on the council, he served as Council President and chaired numerous committees, including Budget, Parks, Public Safety, Human Services, Housing, Arts and Culture. Licata is also a published author of two books, a children's novel and a non-fiction book on citizenship.

Personal history and education
In 1969 Licata received his bachelor's degree in political science from Bowling Green State University where he was President of Students for a Democratic Society (SDS) and Student Body President. In 1973 he received his master's degree in sociology from the University of Washington. He lived in a commune for over twenty years.

Publishing and activism
Licata founded and published the People's Yellow Pages (1973 and 1976), which listed community and political groups, and social and public services in Seattle. He later published the Seattle Sun alt-weekly which was published from 1974 to 1982. Licata is the author of Princess Bianca and the Vandals, a children's fantasy/adventure book dealing with environmental issues. In 2016, he authored Becoming A Citizen Activist - Stories, Strategies and Advice for Changing Our World, published by Sasquatch Books.

Licata helped found the anti-redlining organization Coalition Against Redlining in Seattle and testified before Congress on the Community Reinvestment Act. In 1983 Licata co-founded Give Peace a Dance which, for 6 years, held 24-hour dance marathons to raise funds for TV ads promoting nuclear disarmament. Licata was Co-Chair of Citizens for More Important Things, a group opposed to excessive public funding for professional sports stadiums. It wrote King County Initiative 16, collecting over 73,000 signatures to be placed on the ballot. It won but was voided by the State Legislature a week later. Licata later testified before Congress at the request of Congressman Dennis Kucinich on the financial drain that public funding of professional sport teams placed on municipal governments. Licata is founding chair of Local Progress, a nationwide organization of progressive local officials. The Nation's "Progressive Honor Roll of 2012" chose Licata as its "Most Valuable Local Official" in the United States.

Seattle City Council tenure
Upon his election to the City Council, he instituted poetry readings, titled Words Worth, in his committee meetings believing that the personal insight of poetry has the power to enlighten the routine of government. Licata initiated Seattle's "Poet Populist" position in 1999 which engaged the public in voting each year for a local poet to lead public events, read in public schools and libraries.

In 2007, Licata supported Initiative I-91, which prohibited the city from supporting sports teams unless such investments had a fair return, which facilitated the relocation of the Seattle SuperSonics from Seattle to Oklahoma City. In addition, Licata stated in 2007 that the absence of the SuperSonics from Seattle would leave a "near zero" economic impact to the city. On September 24, 2012, Licata voted No on a proposed SoDo basketball arena, which was eventually approved 6-2 by the remaining Council members.

Licata was one of two City Council members who supported rebuilding the Alaskan Way Viaduct in 2008, and later supported a tunnel alternative.

Licata sponsored Seattle's law requiring that all Seattle employers with more than four full-time equivalent employees provide paid sick leave.

During part of his time in office, Licata served as Council President.

References

External links

City of Seattle Bio

1947 births
Living people
Seattle City Council members
Bowling Green State University alumni
University of Washington College of Arts and Sciences alumni
Politicians from Cleveland